Michael Sean Brady (born 1965) is a British philosopher and Professor of Philosophy at the University of Glasgow in Scotland. He is best known for his works on philosophy of emotions.

Books
 Emotional Insight: The Epistemic Role of Emotional Experience, Oxford University Press, 2013, 
 Emotion: The Basics, Routledge, 2018, 
 Suffering and Virtue, Oxford University Press, 2018,

See also
Suffering

References

External links
Michael Brady at the University of Glasgow

21st-century British philosophers
Philosophy academics
Living people
Academics of the University of Glasgow
1965 births
Moral psychologists